The 2009–10 Lega Pro Prima Divisione season was the thirty-second football league season of Italian Lega Pro Prima Divisione since its establishment in 1978, and the second since the renaming from Serie C to Lega Pro.

It was divided into two phases: the regular season, played from 23 August 2009 to May 2010, and the playoff phase from May to June 2010.

The league was contested by 36 teams, geographically divided into two divisions of 18 teams each. Teams only played other teams in their own division, once at home and once away for a total of 34 matches each.

Teams finishing first in the regular season, plus one team winning the playoff round from each division were promoted to Serie B; teams finishing last in the regular season, plus two relegation playoff losers from each division were relegated to Lega Pro Seconda Divisione. Four teams were thus promoted to Serie B and six teams were relegated to Lega Pro Seconda Divisione.

Events

Start of season
The league was to feature four teams relegated from Serie B in 2008–09; Rimini, Pisa, Avellino, and Treviso. On July 9, the Covisoc (Commissione di Vigilanza sulle Società Calcistiche, Vigilancy Commission on Football Clubs) organization announced that Pisa, Avellino, and Treviso did not pass the financial requirements in order to be admitted to the league.  The clubs were allowed to appeal the decision until 11 July. On 10 July, Pisa announced they were not appealing the exclusion from the league due to their failure to meet the financial requirements.  The next day, Treviso and Avellino failed to appeal the exclusion as well.

It is to feature six teams promoted from 2008–09 Lega Pro Seconda Divisione; the three division winners - Varese, Figline & Cosenza, and the three playoff winners - Como, Giulianova & Pescina V.d.G.

The remaining 26 teams were to come from the teams that played in 2008–09 Lega Pro Prima Divisione that were neither promoted nor relegated.  Of those, Venezia (17th in Girone A), and Perugia (8th in Girone B) were also listed by the Covisoc organization as not having met the financial requirements to be admitted.  On July 11, Venice mayor Massimo Cacciari announced Venezia did not manage to fulfil the financial requirements to appeal the exclusion. On the other hand, the commission did allow Perugia to remain in Prima Divisione on appeal.

On 30 July 2009, the four vacancies created were filled by the following teams, all of which were destined to play in Lega Pro Seconda Divisione for the 2009–10 season before the call-up:

Potenza, which finished last in Prima Divisione 2008-09 - Girone B
Alessandria, which lost in the playoff finals in Seconda Divisione 2008-09 - Girone A
Andria, which lost in the playoff semi-finals in Seconda Divisione 2008-09 - Girone C
Viareggio, which lost in the playoff semi-finals in Seconda Divisione 2008-09 - Girone B

Exclusion of Potenza from the league
On 19 March 2010, after an investigation and a consequent trial at the Italian Football Federation, Federal Court of Justice, Potenza was found guilt of match-fixing involving a 2008 league match against Salernitana and was punished with immediate exclusion from the league. It was the first time in Italian professional football that a club was excluded from a league during the season for a corruption case. In April 1993 Unione Sportiva Arezzo was excluded from Serie C1 Girone A with still seven matches to go, but due to bankruptcy and subsequent failure of their license.

The verdict was however partly reverted on appeal later on 2 April, when the Tribunale Nazionale di Arbitrato per lo Sport (National Arbitration Court for Sports) admitted Potenza back to the league in order to allow the club complete the season; however the club will nevertheless appear as last-placed in the final table, regardless of the results from the coming games, thus forcing Potenza to play in the Lega Pro Seconda Divisione for the 2010–11 season.

Girone A

Teams

League table

Play-offs

Promotion
Semifinals
First legs played 23 May 2010; return legs played 30 May 2010

Final
First leg played 6 June 2010; return leg played 13 June 2010

Varese promoted to Serie B.

Relegation
First legs played 23 May 2010; return legs played 30 May 2010

Paganese and Pro Patria relegated to Lega Pro Seconda Divisione.

Results

Girone B

Teams

League table

Promotion Playoffs
Semifinals
First legs played 23 May 2010; return legs played 30 May 2010

Final
First leg played 6 June 2010; return leg played 13 June 2010

Pescara promoted to Serie B.

Relegation
First legs played 23 May 2010; return legs played 30 May 2010

Giulianova and Pescina relegated to Lega Pro Seconda Divisione.

Results

References 

Lega Pro Prima Divisione seasons
Italy
3